M. D. R. Ramachandran was an Indian politician. He served as Chief Minister of Pondicherry from 1980 to 1983 and from 1990 to 1991, and as Speaker of the Pondicherry Legislative Assembly from 2001 to 2006. Ramachandran is deceased.

References

Year of birth missing
Year of death missing
Chief ministers from Dravida Munnetra Kazhagam
Chief ministers of Puducherry
Dravida Munnetra Kazhagam politicians
Speakers of Puducherry Legislative Assembly
Puducherry politicians
Indian National Congress politicians
All India Anna Dravida Munnetra Kazhagam politicians